Arabic Language Academy may refer to:

 Arab Academy of Damascus
 Supreme Council of the Arabic language in Algeria
 Iraqi Academy of Sciences in Baghdad
 Lebanese Academy of Sciences
 Jordan Academy of Arabic
 Academy of the Arabic Language in Cairo
 Academy of the Arabic Language in Israel
 Tunisian Academy of Sciences, Letters, and Arts
 King Salman Global Academy for Arabic Language

Acad
 
Arab world-related lists
Arab studies
Lists of organizations